Ludwig Quidde (23 March 1858, Free City of Bremen – 4 March 1941) was a German politician and pacifist who is mainly remembered today for his acerbic criticism of German Emperor Wilhelm II. Quidde's long career spanned four different eras of German history: that of Bismarck (up to 1890); the Hohenzollern Empire under Wilhelm II (1888–1918); the Weimar Republic (1918–1933); and, finally, Nazi Germany. In 1927, he was awarded the Nobel Peace Prize.

Born into a wealthy bourgeois merchant family, Quidde grew up in Bremen, read history and also got involved in the activities of the German Peace Society (Deutsche Friedensgesellschaft). In his younger years he had already opposed Bismarck's policies. In 1881 he received his PhD at the University of Göttingen. In 1894 Quidde published a 17-page pamphlet entitled Caligula. Eine Studie über römischen Caesarenwahnsinn (Caligula: A Study of Imperial Insanity). Containing 79 footnotes, the short essay is exclusively about the Roman Empire of the 1st century AD. However, Quidde drew an implicit parallel between the Roman Emperor Caligula and Wilhelm II, de facto accusing both rulers of megalomania. The author had insisted on publishing his pamphlet under his real name, which effectively ended his academic career as a historian when, in some periodical, a short review explained the parallels which otherwise might have gone unnoticed. After he made a derogatory comment on a new medal in honour of William I, German Emperor, German Emperor from 1871 to 1888, he was criminally convicted of lèse majesté, and sentenced to three months in prison, which he served in Stadelheim Prison.

After the end of the First World War, Quidde, like most other Germans, vehemently opposed the Treaty of Versailles but for different reasons from German militarists, who hated mainly the vast restrictions laid upon the German armed forces and the impending economic disaster that would be caused by payment of the high reparations that were decreed. He and other German pacifists thought ahead and hoped that US President Woodrow Wilson would win the day, pointing out that such severe conditions would already sow the seeds of a new war:

When Hitler came to power in 1933, Quidde escaped to Switzerland, finally settling down in Geneva for the rest of his days. He remained an optimist throughout his life. Aged 76, he published his essay "Landfriede und Weltfriede" (1934) at a time when militarism was again on the rise, believing that modern technology might serve as a deterrent from war:

Ludwig Quidde died in his Swiss exile in 1941, aged 82.

Politics and the pacifist movement 

The fortune inherited by Quidde allowed him to devote himself entirely to politics. In 1893, he joined the German People's Party (DtVP) founded in 1868, party that met his anti-militarist, anti-Prussian, democratic and pacifist expectations.

See also
 List of peace activists
 Margarethe Quidde

References 
Notes

Citations

External links

  including the essay based on the Nobel Lecture of December 12, 1927, "Security and Disarmament"
 

1858 births
1941 deaths
German Democratic Party politicians
German Nobel laureates
German pacifists
German Peace Society members
German People's Party (1868) politicians
German prisoners and detainees
Members of the Bavarian Chamber of Deputies
Members of the Weimar National Assembly
Nobel Peace Prize laureates
Politicians from Bremen
Prisoners and detainees of Germany
Progressive People's Party (Germany) politicians
Radical Democratic Party (Germany) politicians
University of Göttingen alumni